"Duele el Amor" is a song by Mexican singer-songwriter Aleks Syntek featuring Spanish singer-songwriter Ana Torroja released on December 15, 2003, as the first single of his album Mundo Lite (2004). "Duele el Amor" is the most commercially successful song by Aleks Syntek and Ana Torroja.

Chart performance

References

2003 singles
2003 songs
Aleks Syntek songs
EMI Latin singles
Number-one singles in Mexico
Male–female vocal duets
2000s ballads
Pop ballads
Rock ballads
Song recordings produced by Áureo Baqueiro
Song recordings produced by Armando Ávila